Jesse Howard Rush (December 26, 1889 – March 16, 1969) was a pitcher in Major League Baseball. He pitched in four games for the Brooklyn Robins during the 1925 baseball season.

External links

1889 births
1969 deaths
People from Kearny County, Kansas
Baseball players from Kansas
Major League Baseball pitchers
Brooklyn Robins players
Tulsa Oilers (baseball) players
Hutchinson Packers players
Columbus Senators players
Parsons Parsons players
Cushing Oilers players
Muskogee Mets players
Waterbury Brasscos players
Ardmore Snappers players
Bridgeport Bears (baseball) players
Birmingham Barons players
Des Moines Demons players
Allentown Dukes players
Harrisburg Senators players
Hazleton Mountaineers players